Sudden Sky is the fourth studio album by American metalcore band Crown the Empire. It was released on July 19, 2019 through Rise Records and was produced by Drew Fulk. It is the band's first album not to feature vocalist Dave Escamilla since their EP Limitless, who departed from the group in January 2017. It is also the last album to feature the band's drummer Brent Taddie before he left the band in January 2022.

Background
On June 27, 2019, Rise Records' YouTube channel released a video titled, "Crown The Empire - The Making of the 'Sudden Sky' Album Cover." The cover was designed through three-dimensional full-body scans of all the band members, which bassist Hayden Tree described as "making [themselves] seem like an art installation in a 3D, futuristic manner." In the aforementioned video, guitarist Brandon Hoover explained that each member's poses were direct depictions of the emotions they felt throughout the course of making the album:

Tree also explained in the video that the album cover's message also ties directly into the album's title:

Track listing

Notes
 "What I Am" is stylized in all lower case, whereas track 4 has the word "Blurry" stylized in all caps and "Out of Place" in all lower case.

Personnel
Crown the Empire
 Andrew Rockhold – lead vocals, keyboards, programming, unclean vocals on "20/20" and "Sudden Sky"
 Brandon Hoover – guitars 
 Hayden Tree – bass, unclean vocals 
 Brent Taddie – drums, percussion

Additional personnel
 Drew Fulk – production
 Justin Deblieck – composition on "20/20" and "Under the Skin"

Charts

References

2019 albums
Crown the Empire albums
Rise Records albums